Li Yi Ph.D. (born 1961) is a sociologist. He is the author of several books and journal articles on sociology.

In 2019, Li was deported from Taiwan during a visit there.

Controversies

 On the 16th of October, 2020, he was invited to give a presentation at a forum in Shenzhen. During his talk, Li claimed that "The COVID-19 is most detrimental to the European and (North) American countries, whereas this pandemic is most beneficial to North Korea and China. We´ve got 4,000 people died because of it, right? But if you compare this with the 220,000 deaths in the U.S., (China's) 4,000 death toll is equivalent to no death at all, am I correct? (Laughter after his speech.) So, there was almost no infection or no death within our country. 4,000 deaths from 1.4 billion population, that´s basically no death. Despite of this (low infection and death rate in China), there are still so many of you wearing masks in this venue. (Longer laughter.)" 
 Later in his speech, Li stated his personal opinions further, "Look at China. Currently, China´s economy is the only one that is doing well in this world. China could overtake the U.S. ahead of time (that we´ve planned), there won´t be a issue by the year 2027. The USA could not survive, the USA won´t survive this. Now I have to say, none of you among all 1.4 billion Chinese people is capable of realizing that it is not the USA who is punishing China. It is us who are giving the Americans a hard time to live."

Works

See also
Social class#Chinese model

References

Chinese scholars
1961 births
Living people
Chinese sociologists
People's Republic of China writers
Chinese non-fiction writers